General elections were held in Tanzania on 28 October 1990. The country was a one-party state at the time, with the Chama Cha Mapinduzi as the sole legal party. For the National Assembly election there were two candidates from the same party in each constituencies, whilst the presidential election was effectively a referendum on CCM leader Ali Hassan Mwinyi's candidacy.

The number of constituencies was increased from 119 to 130. Voter turnout was 74.4% of the 7,296,553 registered voters.

Following the lifting of the ban on other political parties in 1992, this was the last one-party election to be held in Tanzania.

Results

President

National Assembly

References

Presidential elections in Tanzania
1990 in Tanzania
Elections in Tanzania
One-party elections
Tanzania
October 1990 events in Africa